Fair Game is a 2005 romantic comedy film, written and directed by Michael Whaley. Whaley also stars in the film, alongside Gina Torres.

Plot
Michael (Whaley) and Stacey (Torres) are co-workers who can barely get along at the office. When Michael is suddenly thrust out of his home, the two are unexpectedly forced to become roommates. Though neither is particularly happy about the situation, they eventually learn to like each other, to the point where an undeniable attraction forms. However, another man enters Stacey's life right around the same time, complicating things even more than they were before.

Cast
 Gina Torres — Stacey
 Michael Whaley — Michael
 Christopher B. Duncan — Marcus
 Kellita Smith — Cheryl
 LaTocha Scott — Vanessa
 Lia Smith — Fiona
 Mark Christopher Lawrence — Wesley
 Michael Jace — E
 Mother Love — Phyllis
 Terri Vaughn — Wanda

Awards
2005 Motorcity International Film Festival – Best Soundtrack
2005 Pan African Film Festival – Blockbuster Video Audience Favorite

External links

2005 films
African-American films
2005 romantic comedy films
American romantic comedy films
2000s English-language films
2000s American films